Standard Football Club was a 19th-century football club based in Glasgow.

History

The club was formed in 1873, out of a cricket club (founded in 1863) based at Mossdale Park.  In its first season the club claimed not to have conceded a goal, with 4 wins and 3 draws, scoring six goals in the process.

Perhaps buoyed by this season, the club entered the second edition of the Scottish Cup in 1874-75, and was the recipient of the first-ever bye in the tournament in the first round.  In the second, the club was drawn away to the Third Lanarkshire Rifle Volunteers; after a 0-0 draw, in which the Standard goalkeeper "Mr Charleston executed his work in a very creditable manner", Standard lost the replay at home 2-0.  Over the season, the club played 17 matches, with a record of 5 wins, 7 draws, and 5 defeats, scoring just 7 goals, but only conceding 11.

By 1875-76 the club had been overtaken by the plethora of other clubs starting up; it did not win a match during the season, drawing twice and losing four times.  The club lost 2-1 in the first round of the Scottish Cup at fellow Glaswegian side Caledonian in 1876-77, despite having taken the lead, and it does not leave any further record afterwards.

Colours

The club played in blue jerseys, white knickerbockers, and blue and white hooped stockings.

Grounds

The club played its first two seasons at its cricket ground at Mossdale Park, and its final season at Shawlands Park.

External links
Scottish Football Club Directory (Archived 2009-10-22)
RSSSF: Scottish Cup

References

Defunct football clubs in Scotland
Football clubs in Glasgow
Association football clubs established in 1873
Association football clubs disestablished in 1877
1873 establishments in Scotland
1877 disestablishments in Scotland